The Women's 60 kg powerlifting event at the 2004 Summer Paralympics was competed  on 24 September. It was won by Fu Taoying, representing .

Final round

24 Sept. 2004, 16:30

References

W
Para